The People's Democratic Party (Narodna demokratska stranka, NDS) was a political party in Serbia led by Slobodan Vuksanović.

History
Vukasnović was a high official in the Democratic Party until 2000, when he left the party and joined Otpor and subsequently the Movement for Democratic Serbia, led by Momčilo Perišić. He was expelled from the party in 2001 and then formed NDS.

In the 2003 parliamentary elections it was part of the Democratic Party of Serbia-led coalition, winning three of the alliance's 53 seats. It merged into DSS in October 2004.

References

Defunct political parties in Serbia
Political parties disestablished in 2004
2004 disestablishments in Serbia
Democratic Party (Serbia) breakaway groups
Political parties established in 2001
2001 establishments in Serbia